The Chain Gang is a 1930 Mickey Mouse animated film produced by Walt Disney Productions for Columbia Pictures, as part of the Mickey Mouse film series. It was the twenty-first Mickey Mouse short to be produced, the sixth of that year. It is one of a group of shorts of strikingly uneven quality produced by Disney immediately after Ub Iwerks left the studio.

The cartoon was primarily drawn by Norm Ferguson, and featured a pair of bloodhounds, who helped to track down Mickey after his escape from prison.  Although these dogs were not named, the style in which they were drawn makes them clear forerunners of Pluto, who first officially appeared a few months later in The Picnic. The animation for one of the bloodhound scenes in The Chain Gang was recycled as Pluto in four later cartoons.

Plot 
Mickey Mouse is in prison, connected with a chain to six other prisoners as they are led out to the yard for hard labor. He keeps a cheery grin, banging on the iron ball and singing, until the guard, Peg-Leg Pete, tells him to shut up. The prisoners break rocks, but when the guard falls asleep at his post, Mickey plays Vernon Dalhart's "The Prisoner's Song" on his harmonica. The other prisoners join in with the song, singing and using their implements as instruments.

One of the inmates dances to the tune of Felix Mendelssohn's "Spring Song"—but when he spits on the guard, Pete wakes up and whistles for help. This starts a riot, and the guards shoot at the prisoners. Mickey uses a seesaw to fly over the prison wall, and escapes into the nearby woods.

Mickey is chased into a swamp by a guard accompanied by two bloodhounds, and tries to get away by riding a pair of horses. With the horses out of control, Mickey flies off a cliff, which happens to be right above the prison. He falls through the roof into a cell, where two inmates happily sing "We're Here Because We're Here". Mickey joins in for the final iris out.

Legacy 
In a scene animated by Norm Ferguson, Mickey is chased by two bloodhounds after his prison break, and we see each hound approach and sniff, then bark directly into the camera. According to Gijs Grob in Mickey's Movies, "These hounds are possibly the most elaborately designed and most naturally behaving animals in any theatrical cartoon hitherto, and would become the prototype of Pluto." In 1932, Disney's in-house art instructor Don Graham said: "The dogs were alive, real. They seemed to breathe. They moved like dogs, not drawings of dogs. The drawings explained not so much what a real dog looked like, but what a real dog did."

Reception 
Variety: "One of the most amusing cartoons released. Has to do with animal prison. "Volga Boatman" and "Prison Song" theming. Usual method of using each other's tails or hoofs for instruments. A jailbreak is used effectively."

Home media 
The short was released on December 2, 2002, on Walt Disney Treasures: Mickey Mouse in Black and White and on December 7, 2004, on Walt Disney Treasures: The Complete Pluto: 1930-1947.

References

External links 
 The Chain Gang at Disney Shorts
 

1930s Disney animated short films
Mickey Mouse short films
1930 short films
1930 animated films
1930 films
1930s prison films
Films directed by Burt Gillett
Films produced by Walt Disney
American prison films
American black-and-white films
Animated films about dogs
Columbia Pictures short films
Columbia Pictures animated short films
1930s American films